Iowa Highway 130 (Iowa 130) is a  state highway that traverses northwestern Scott County and eastern Cedar County in eastern Iowa.  It begins in Tipton at Iowa 38 and ends at Interstate 80 (I-80) / U.S. Highway 61 (US 61) in Davenport.  The highway was designated in 1969 as part of a renumbering of state highways throughout the state.  From 1949 to the renumbering, the route was part of Iowa 150; before that, it was known as Iowa 74.

Route description
Iowa Highway 130 begins in Tipton at an intersection with Iowa Highway 38. It proceeds eastward from Tipton and shortly before Bennett, it turns south to enter town. From Bennett, it goes east, turning southeast to go through New Liberty. It continues southeast through Plainview and Maysville and ends at exit 292 along Interstate 80 in Davenport.

History
Iowa Highway 130 was designated in 1969, along a section of Iowa Highway 150.  Until the mid-1970s, Highway 130 extended to US 61 / US 67 along the Davenport riverfront.  By the 1980s, a portion of Harrison and Brady Streets had become one-way streets, joining near Vander Veer Park, leading to Iowa 130 to be truncated at the park.  When Welcome Way was completed in 1983 and southbound traffic was moved onto Harrison Street, Iowa 130 was truncated further back to Interstate 80.

Major intersections

References

130
Transportation in Scott County, Iowa
Transportation in Cedar County, Iowa